Kam Shan is an area of Tai Po District, Hong Kong, including and surrounding Kam Shan Village.

Administration
Kam Shan is a recognised village under the New Territories Small House Policy. It is one of the villages represented within the Tai Po Rural Committee. For electoral purposes, Kam Shan is part of the San Fu constituency, which was formerly represented by Max Wu Yiu-cheong until May 2021.

References

External links

 Delineation of area of existing village Kam Shan Village (Tai Po) for election of resident representative (2019 to 2022)

Populated places in Hong Kong
Villages in Tai Po District, Hong Kong